Nick Heather is a clinical psychologist, alcohol researcher and Emeritus Professor of Alcohol & Other Drug Studies at Northumbria University. He was one of the pioneers of brief intervention techniques to reduce alcohol misuse, and has challenged the disease theory of alcoholism and has over five hundred research publications and books.

Early life 
Nick Heather was born in London in 1938 and was the son of an off-license manager. Born and still officially named Brian Heather, in an interview for the Journal Addiction he explained after his birth his father remarked he looked like "old Nick" due to thick black hair. In his late teens he joined the Royal Air Force under one of the last phases of National Service, posted mostly in Germany. After various jobs he decided he would take A-levels in an attempt to go to University and in 1965 he received a degree in Psychology and Statistics from University College London, followed by Masters and Doctorates at Leeds and University of Dundee.

In 1976 his first book was published 'Radical Perspectives in Psychology', which critiqued psychiatry and some of the academic approaches to psychology at the time.

Challenging the disease model of 'alcoholism' 
Heather has had a number of books published which present evidence and theories that intend to disprove the notion that alcoholism exists as a disease. In 1981 Heather co-authored a book on controlled drinking, which looked at a number of studies that found some dependent drinkers were able to return to problem free drinking.  In 1997 Heather's co-authored book 'Problem Drinking' was published by Oxford Medical Publications. The book extensively explored alcohol problems and their interpretation through various research and debate, repeatedly setting out evidence to contest disease model interpretations of alcohol problems.

As well as evidence of controlled drinking in some formerly dependent drinkers, a wide variety of other evidence is set out to contest the disease model. One strong theme of the book is the complexity of alcohol problems, whereby dependence itself can vary greatly in severity. As such, Heather argues that there is no hard and fast line between  'alcoholics' and 'non-alcoholics', so the concept is inherently flawed. Also argued are that many people who do indeed develop alcohol dependence do recover, often spontaneously or without subscribing to any formal support. Dependence does not also mean an inevitable progression into worsening addiction and ultimately 'rock bottom', as is often claimed by disease model advocates.

Despite arguing that alcohol problems are in a large part attributable to social learning theory, Heather still recognises the role of genetics as an influencing risk factor for developing alcohol dependence. However whilst some people may have a genetic predisposition, there are a wide range of socio-psychological factors that also significantly influence risk of dependency, rendering disease model thinking simplistic and flawed. In the  2007 interview with the Addiction Journal, Nick Heather stated he was "depressed by the resurgence of the
notion of there is something called ‘alcoholism’ which is a brain disease", which has "held us back from a proper understanding of alcohol problems and how they may be resolved in all kinds of ways".

Heather was also instrumental in establishing the 'New Directions in the Study of Alcohol Group' (NDSAG) in the 1970s, which allowed those working in the addictions field to come together to discuss and challenge notions such as the disease model. Heather remains Honorary President of the Group, which in 2016 holds its 40th annual conference.

The development of brief interventions 
The delivery of brief intervention for non-dependent drinkers is a key alcohol public health policy in many countries across the globe. Although some literature credits the early development of brief intervention to the United States, its true origins go back to the Scottish Highlands through work by Heather and colleagues.

By the 1980s Heather was becoming an experienced alcohol researcher, specifically focusing on work relating to 'controlled drinking'. In part, brief interventions came about because of difficulties recruiting dependent drinkers for studies meant Heather and colleagues sought other participants out through primary care. Heather collaborated with the Scottish Health Education Group to produce a screening and intervention pack for general practitioners called DRAMS (Drinking Responsibly and Moderately with Self-control). Heather has stated the Scottish Health Education Group was an important and innovative group in the 1970s and 1980s but was closed down by the government for criticising government policy.

Although other researchers later delivered some of the research trials that more convincingly proved the effectiveness of brief intervention approaches, Heather has continued to play a significant and influential role in their continued development including involvement in many further research trials and journal articles.

Publications 
Heather has over 500 publications, mainly peer reviewed journal articles and a number of book titles. Most recently he co-edited 'Addiction & Choice: rethinking the relationship' with Gabriel Segal, which includes a number of chapters by leading experts in the addiction field. The book explores a 'multidisciplinary perspective from philosophy, neuroscience, psychiatry, psychology and the law, demonstrating to readers how diverse positions from varying academic and scientific disciplines can cohere to form a radically new perspective on addiction'.

Jellinek Memorial Award 
In 2017 Heather was awarded the Jellinek Memorial Award. The award, in honour of E.M Jellinek, is an international award presented to scientists who have made an outstanding contribution to the advancement of knowledge in the alcohol addiction field.

Notes

References

External links 
 New Directions in the Study of Alcohol Group
 ResearchGate profile.

Year of birth missing (living people)
Living people
British psychologists
Alumni of the University of Dundee
Academics of Northumbria University
Writers on addiction